Ptychogastriidae is a family of cnidarians belonging to the order Trachymedusae.

Genera:
 Glaciambulata Galea, 2016
 Ptychogastria Allman, 1878
 Tesserogastria Beyer, 1958

References

Trachymedusae
Cnidarian families